2-tert-Butyl phenol is an organic compound with the formula (CH3)3CC6H4OH.  It is one of three isomeric tert-butyl phenols.  It is a colorless oil that dissolves in basic water. It can be prepared by acid-catalyzed alkylation of phenol with isobutene.

Uses 
2-tert-Butylphenol is an intermediate in the industrial production of 2,6-di-tert-butylphenol, a common antioxidant.

Hydrogenation of 2-tert-butylphenol gives cis-2-tert-butylcyclohexanol, which when acetylated is a commercial fragrance.

References 

Alkylphenols